Oleg Ivanovich Kokarev (born 30 March 1963) is a Russian professional football coach and a former player. He is the manager of FC Sakhalin Yuzhno-Sakhalinsk.

Club career
As a player, he made his debut in the Soviet Second League in 1984 for FC Uralets Nizhny Tagil.

References

1963 births
People from Nizhny Tagil
Living people
Soviet footballers
Russian footballers
Association football forwards
FC Okean Nakhodka players
FC Ural Yekaterinburg players
FC Sibir Novosibirsk players
Russian Premier League players
Russian football managers
FC Ural Yekaterinburg managers
FC Okean Nakhodka managers
FC Uralets Nizhny Tagil players
Sportspeople from Sverdlovsk Oblast